Kevin Cooney (born August 12, 1950) is an American former college baseball coach who was the head coach at Montclair State from 1984–1987 and Florida Atlantic from 1988–2008. Under Cooney, the teams combined to appear in 11 NCAA Tournaments, including six in Division I.  Montclair State won the Division III National Championship in 1987.  Individually, Cooney was named the TAAC Coach of the Year in 1999.

Playing career
A New Jersey native, Cooney attended Montclair State University in Montclair, New Jersey. He played baseball for the Red Hawks from 1970–1972.  A pitcher, Cooney had a career 18-3 record, 2.35 ERA, and 164 strikeouts.  In 1972, his final season at Montclair, the program appeared in its first NCAA Tournament, finishing third in the East Regional. Following the season, the Minnesota Twins selected him in the 11th round of the MLB Draft.

Cooney played two professional seasons, advancing as high as Class A Wisconsin Rapids before a shoulder injury ended his playing career. Over the two seasons, Cooney compiled a 19-11 record and a 3.43 ERA.

Coaching career

Montclair State
Following his playing career, Cooney returned to Montclair State as an assistant under Clary Anderson, whom he had played for a few years earlier. Cooney worked as an assistant from 1975–1976. The Red Hawks made the NCAA Tournament in both seasons. Anderson left to become the head coach at Fairleigh Dickinson after the 1976 season; Cooney also left Montclair and worked as a high school teacher and coach in the late 1970s and early 1980s.

When Montclair's next head coach, Fred Hill, left for Rutgers following the 1983 season, Cooney returned as the Red Hawks' head coach. In Cooney's four seasons at Montclair (1984–1987), the Red Hawks went 138-50-2, reached four Division III College World Series, and won the 1987 national championship.  In 1987, the team went 3-0 to win its regional, defeating North Adams State, 11-5, and Upsala, 17-2 and 16-15 in 10 innings.  At that year's College World Series, Montclair went 4-0 with two extra inning wins to win the title. It beat Eastern Connecticut, UC San Diego, and UW-Oshkosh to advance to the championship game, where it defeated Oshkosh, 13-12 in 10 innings.

During Cooney's stint at Montclair, three players were selected in the Major League Baseball Draft, including seventh-round selection Dan Olsson in 1985.

Florida Atlantic

Division II
Prior to the 1988 season, Division II Florida Atlantic (FAU) hired Cooney to replace Steve Traylor, who had left to become the head coach at Duke.  Cooney held the position for 21 seasons, leading FAU to Division I, seven NCAA Tournaments, and a 742-480-5 overall record.

For Cooney's first six seasons, 1988–1993, FAU played as an independent school in Division II, though its schedule included a mix of Division I and Division II teams.  In 1991, Cooney hired John McCormack, who would remain with the program as an assistant through the end of Cooney's tenure.  He also opened the FAU Baseball Stadium in 1991.  The Blue Wave's best season during this stretch was 1993, when it went 41-17 and reached an NCAA Regional championship game.

Division I
For the 1994 season, FAU transitioned to Division I, joining the Trans America Athletic Conference.

After being ineligible for the postseason in 1994, the program made its first Division I postseason in 1995, finishing fourth in the TAAC to qualify for the TAAC Tournament.  As the fourth seed, the Blue Wave won their first game against top-seeded FIU, then lost consecutive games to Stetson and UCF and was eliminated.

FAU reached its first Division I Tournament in 1999, one of its best seasons under Cooney.  It went 51-5 in the regular season; the season included a 34-game win streak from February to April that tied Texas's NCAA record.  Pitcher Todd Moser was named the A-Sun Player of the Year.  At the TAAC Tournament at Osceola County Stadium, the Blue Wave went 1-2 but qualified for the NCAA Tournament with an at-large bid.  At the Coral Gables Regional, the team lost its opener to FIU, then defeated Bethune-Cookman and FIU before losing to host Miami in the regional championship.

The Blue Wave returned to the NCAA Tournament in 2000, then made their deepest postseason run under Cooney in 2002. After a 40-15 regular season in which they placed second in the A-Sun,  the Blue Wave went 3-2 at the A-Sun Tournament, losing to top-seeded UCF in the title game.  They were then awarded an at-large bid to the NCAA Tournament as the third seed in the Tuscaloosa Regional.  Both lower seeds won their regional openers (FAU 16-11 over Auburn), setting up a 1-0 game with Southeast Missouri State that FAU won to reach the regional championship round. There, they lost one game to host Alabama, 7-2, but defeated the Crimson Tide in the decisive seventh game to advance to the best-of-three super regional round. In the Atlanta Super Regional, Georgia Tech swept the Blue Wave in two games.

The 2002 appearance was the first of four consecutive NCAA Tournaments for the program, but it did not advance past the regionals in 2003, 2004, or 2005.  (Of Cooney's six Division I Tournament appearances at FAU, 2002 was the only year in which the Blue Wave were not placed at the Coral Gables Regional, hosted by nearby Miami.)  In 2004, FAU won its only A-Sun Tournament under Cooney; Rusty Brown was named the tournament MVP.

During Cooney's 21 seasons at FAU, the program had 58 selections in the Major League Baseball Draft.  The highest was Jeff Fiorentino, a future Major Leaguer selected 79th overall in 2004.  Other of Cooney's players to appear in Major League Baseball were Tim Harikkala, Carmen Cali, Tommy Murphy, Michael Crotta, Mickey Storey, and Jeff Beliveau.

FAU moved to the Sun Belt Conference for Cooney's final two seasons (2007–2008). The Owls (renamed following the 2005 season) had two 30-win seasons and made two Sun Belt Tournaments, but did not qualify for the NCAA Tournament in either season.  Following the 2008 season, Cooney announced his retirement.

Head coaching record
The following is a table of Cooney's yearly records as a collegiate head baseball coach.

Personal
Cooney has four children. His oldest son, Jim, pitched for Cooney from 1999–2002, was drafted by the Baltimore Orioles, and played three years of professional baseball.

Since retiring from coaching, Cooney has moved to Sweetwater, Tennessee and started business ventures in farming, antiques, and Christmas tree growing.

In 2012, Cooney was inducted into the FAU Hall of Fame.

Notes

References

External links
 Cooney's 2008 weekly column for CollegeBaseballInsider.com
 Archive of his 2004–2007 columns
 Parts One and Two of Cooney's FAU Hall of Fame Induction Speech at Youtube.com

1950 births
People from New Jersey
Montclair State Red Hawks baseball players
Melbourne Twins players
Orlando Twins players
Wisconsin Rapids Twins players
High school baseball coaches in the United States
Montclair State Red Hawks baseball coaches
Florida Atlantic Owls baseball coaches
Living people